Rex Records, sometimes identified by its record series Rex Heritage, was an independent record label based in Holyoke, Massachusetts.  It was founded by Joe and Wanda Chesky who marketed it as "the king of polkas" releasing a substantial catalog of polka bands primarily from the New England area, as well as the Great Lakes states.  Their artists included Bob Uguccioni, Wesoly Bolek, Fred Gregorich & the Del Fi's, Big Ted Nowak, Big Steve & the Bellaires, Walt Cieslik, Happy, Louie, Walt Solek, Jimmy Sturr, Al Soyka, and their son, Larry Chesky, who became largely identified with the label. While primarily a producer of LPs, the label also produced some 45 singles, as well as cassettes and 8-tracks. In its earliest years, the label appeared as a subsidiary of Al Solka's "Glo Records" of Somers, Connecticut, and for two decades was based out of 3 Granville Street, expanding into a larger space at 34 Martin Street in 1972. Rex Records remained active in some capacity into the late 1980s, releasing a limited set of 100 cassettes recording the music rolls of the Holyoke Merry-Go-Round organ in 1988, during the fundraising effort which saved it—Chesky himself having been a fixture at Mountain Park for decades.

Genres and artists

While the label was primarily dedicated to polka, especially big band polka, the label would also expand to include pressings Irish traditional music in the 1970s, producing more than a dozen such albums under the heading "Rex Heritage Disc", including several from the Emerald Isle as well as local Holyoke Irish artists. Notably the label produced the debut solo album of Irish accordionist James Keane and the American debut album of rebel music band The Barleycorn.

Polka
 Wesoły Bolek
 Larry Chesky and His Orchestra
 Walt Cieslik And The Musical Ambassadors
 Al "Cocoa" Czelusniak
 Fred Gregorich And The "Del Fi's"
 Regina Kujawa
 Happy Louie and Julcia's Polka Band
 Johnny Menko
 Ed Podolak & His Polka Cats
 Johnny Prytko
 The Rhythm Orchestra
 Bob Siwicki And His New Englanders Orchestra
 Walter Solek
 Al Soyka
 Jimmy Sturr
 Bob Szymanski Orchestra

Choirs
 The Lutnia Choir, Holy Mother of the Rosary Parish (Chicopee)
 Mater Dolorosa Choir
 St. Cecilia Choir, Our Lady of Czestochowa Parish
 The St. Joseph Choir of Webster, Massachusetts
 United Choirs Of New England

Irish folk
 The Barleycorn
 Butch & Maeve
 Butch Moore
 Maeve Mulvany
 The Dustmen
 Dermott Flynn & David Stone
 Chris Henshaw
 The Irish Tradition
 James Keane
 Dickie McManus and the Irish Revolution
 Michael Owens
 Chris Tabb And His Emerald Isle Orchestra

See also 
 List of record labels
 Rex Records (disambiguation)

References

External links 
 Rex Records, incomplete catalog at Discogs
 Larry Chesky, International Polka Association Hall of Fame
 "Polka Doll", since-defunct website operated by Chesky's daughters

Companies based in Holyoke, Massachusetts
Mass media in Holyoke, Massachusetts
American record labels
Folk record labels
Record labels established in 1957
Record labels based in Massachusetts
World music record labels